IMOCA or iMOCA may refer to:

 Indianapolis Museum of Contemporary Art
 International Monohull Open Class Association
 IMOCA 50, a former 50ft racing yacht class
 IMOCA 60, an active 60ft racing yacht class used for Vendee Globe